Donald Andrew Lund (May 18, 1923 – December 10, 2013) was an American professional baseball outfielder who played in Major League Baseball for the Brooklyn Dodgers (1945, 1947–1948), St. Louis Browns (1948) and Detroit Tigers (1949, 1952–1954). He batted and threw right-handed.
 
Born in Detroit, Michigan, Lund graduated from Detroit Southeastern High School and then attended the University of Michigan where he lettered in baseball, football and basketball. He was signed out of the University of Michigan by the Brooklyn Dodgers in 1945. Although drafted in the 1st round of the NFL draft in 1945 by the Chicago Bears as a running back, Lund felt baseball would be the better career choice. Used mainly as a reserve, he played part of three seasons with the Dodgers and St. Louis Browns between 1945 and 1948. On June 18, 1953, Lund made the final put-out in right field when Boston scored an MLB record 17 runs against the Tigers in one inning. He played his last season in 1954 as a backup for teenager rookie Al Kaline. 
 
In a seven-season career, Lund was a .240 hitter with 15 home runs and 86 RBI in 281 games.

Following his major league career, Lund served as head baseball coach at the University of Michigan. Under his leadership, the Wolverines won the College World Series in 1962. He also coached for the Tigers and was director of their farm system from 1963 through 1970.
 
Lund was inducted into the Michigan Hall of Honor in 1984 for his significant contributions as a football, baseball, and basketball player and baseball coach as well. Lund was inducted into the Michigan Sports Hall of Fame in 1987.

In 2009, James Robert Irwin wrote a book about the life of Don Lund, "Playing Ball with Legends: The Story and the Stories of Don Lund."

He died on December 10, 2013, at the age of 90 at his home in Ann Arbor, Michigan.

See also
 University of Michigan Athletic Hall of Honor

References

External links
, or Retrosheet, or Baseball Biography - Don Lund
SABR BioProject page
Vintage Card Traders 1954 Series Don Lund Card 

1923 births
2013 deaths
Baseball players from Detroit
Brooklyn Dodgers players
Buffalo Bisons (minor league) players
Detroit Tigers coaches
Detroit Tigers players
Major League Baseball outfielders
Michigan Wolverines baseball coaches
Michigan Wolverines baseball players
Michigan Wolverines football players
Michigan Wolverines men's basketball players
Minneapolis Millers (baseball) players
Minor league baseball managers
Mobile Bears players
St. Louis Browns players
St. Paul Saints (AA) players
San Diego Padres (minor league) players
Southeastern High School (Michigan) alumni
Toledo Mud Hens players
Baseball players from Ann Arbor, Michigan
Basketball players from Ann Arbor, Michigan
Players of American football from Ann Arbor, Michigan
American men's basketball players